Islamica is an Islamic company founded in Chicago, Illinois that sells apparel, accessories and media marketed towards Muslim youth. It was founded in 1999 by Mirza Baig, Azher Ahmed and Afeef Abdul-Majeed.

Islamica hosts an internet forum which is one of the busiest Muslim websites in North America. Islamica News offers Muslim-oriented parody news.

References

External links
 Islamica Community website
 Islamica News website

Islam in Illinois
Islamic media
Business organizations based in the United States
Companies based in Chicago